Mohammad Farhangdoust (1946–2012) was an Iranian freestyle wrestler. He won silver medals at the 1970 and 1971 World Championships and 1970 Asian Games. He retired in 1972 after an injury sustained in a tournament. In his last years he battled with cancer, and underwent treatment in Germany and Canada. He died in Canada aged 66.

References

1946 births
2012 deaths
World Wrestling Championships medalists
Iranian male sport wrestlers
Medalists at the 1970 Asian Games
Asian Games medalists in wrestling
Wrestlers at the 1970 Asian Games
Asian Games silver medalists for Iran
People from Rasht
Sportspeople from Gilan province
20th-century Iranian people